The 2010 season was Daegu F.C.'s 8th season in South Korea's K-League.

Season summary

Defender Bang Dae-jong who had played for the club since being drafted in 2008, was appointed captain for the 2010 season.  Brazilian import Leo stayed for another season, supported by another Brazilian striker, Anderson.  A young Argentine defender, Lucas Basualdo also joined the club but never took to the football field and disappeared during the midseason break.  Anderson left at the same time, and he was replaced by another young Argentine Issac, who saw little game play.

On field, Daegu repeated their dismal performances of the previous season, finishing 15th in the K-League standings, equal with Gwangju Sangmu on points.  The defensive effort was dire, and Daegu conceded the most goals of any club in the league, losing 19 games out of 28 games, with five wins and four draws.  Goal scoring was also limited, and Cho Hyung-Ik was top scorer for the club with eight goals.

Daegu fared little better in the FA Cup, losing 0:1 to National League side Suwon City in extra time.  Better results were achieved in the League Cup, with Daegu progressing out of their group to the knockout stage, thanks to wins over Daejeon and Busan.  Unfortunately, they drew FC Seoul in their first knockout match.  Although holding their more fancied opponents to a 2-2 draw after extra time was completed, Daegu lost the subsequent penalty shootout.

Squad

Players In/Out

In

Out

Statistics
Updated to games played 7 November 2010.

|}

Club

Coaching staff

Managerial Changes

Competitions

K-League

Matches

Standings

Results summary

Results by round

Korean FA Cup

Matches

K-League Cup

Matches

Standings

See also
Daegu F.C.

References

External links
Daegu FC Official website  

Daegu FC seasons
South Korean football clubs 2010 season